Bequest to the Nation may refer to:

 A Bequest to the Nation, a 1970 play by Terence Rattigan
 Bequest to the Nation (film), a 1973 film adaptation